The Hooker County Courthouse, located on Cleveland Ave. between Railroad and 1st Sts. in Mullen, Nebraska, is a courthouse building of Hooker County, Nebraska.  It was built in 1912.  It was a work of Grand Island architect Oscar R. Kirschke.

It was listed on the National Register of Historic Places in 1990.  It was deemed significant as a good example of the "County Citadel" type of courthouse.

References

External links 

More photos of the Hooker County Courthouse at Wikimedia Commons

Courthouses on the National Register of Historic Places in Nebraska
Government buildings completed in 1912
Buildings and structures in Hooker County, Nebraska
1912 establishments in Nebraska
Historic districts on the National Register of Historic Places in Nebraska
National Register of Historic Places in Hooker County, Nebraska